Clarion Hotel Helsinki is a hotel in the Jätkäsaari district of Helsinki, Finland, opened on 17 October 2016. The top floor contains a health club, a sauna and a rooftop pool. The building was commissioned by the Norwegian building millionaire Arthur Burchardt. The hotel is managed by the Nordic hotel chain Nordic Choice Hotels and is the chain's first hotel in Finland. Nordic Choice Hotels is a franchising partner of the international Choice Hotels chain, owned by the Norwegian "hotel magnate" and environmental activist Petter Stordalen.

Of the two 16-floor towers in the hotel one has an interior decoration with a light Finnish style and the other has one with an international darker style.

The protected harbour warehouse building designed by Lars Sonck, located next to the building, was renovated into a convention centre.

References

External links
 
 Official site
 Discussion about the construction of the hotel at Taloforum.fi

Hotels in Helsinki
Jätkäsaari